Transwa is Western Australia's regional public transport provider, linking 240 destinations, from Kalbarri in the north to Augusta in the south west to Esperance in the south east.

The Transwa system provides transport to the major regional centres of Bunbury, Kalgoorlie, Northam, Geraldton and Albany.

Transwa is part of the Public Transport Authority and was launched on 28 May 2003 replacing the Western Australian Government Railways Commission.

Services

Rail services 
Transwa operate four rail services:
 Australind: Perth to Bunbury
 AvonLink: Midland to Northam
MerredinLink: East Perth to Merredin 
 The Prospector: East Perth to Kalgoorlie

Road services 
In 2003/04, Transwa introduced 21 Volgren bodied Scania K124EB coaches aimed at revitalising the country coach fleet, which travel to many destinations across southern Western Australia including Albany, Augusta, Pemberton, Esperance, Geraldton, Kalbarri and Meekatharra. In 2015, an order was placed for 23 Irizar i6 3700-bodied Volvo B11R coaches to replace the Scanias.

There are 16 routes:

GE1: Perth to Esperance via Jerramungup/Dumbleyung
GE2: Perth to Esperance via Kulin/Hyden
GE3: Kalgoorlie to Esperance
GE4: Albany to Hopetoun via Ravensthorpe
GS1: Perth to Albany via Williams/Kojonup
GS2: Perth to Albany/Gnowangerup/Katanning via Northam/Narrogin
GS3: Bunbury to Albany via Walpole
N1: Perth to Geraldton/Kalbarri via Eneabba
N2: Perth to Geraldton via Moora/Kalbarri
N3: Perth to Geraldton via Northam/Mullewa
N4: Geraldton to Meekatharra
N5: Perth to Geraldton via Jurien Bay
SW1: Perth to Augusta/Pemberton via Bunbury
SW2: Perth to Pemberton via Bunbury and Donnybrook
SW3: Perth to Pemberton via Bunbury, Collie, Boyup Brook and Bridgetown
SW4: Bunbury to Boyup Brook via Brunswick and Collie

Fleet

Railcars

Coaches 
 23 Volvo B11R coaches

Ridership

See also 
List of Transwa railway stations

References

External links 
Transwa website

Bus companies of Western Australia
Passenger railway companies of Australia
Public transport in Western Australia
Railway companies established in 2003
Australian companies established in 2003